Olga Ivanova (born 3 February 1977) is a former Russian tennis player.

Ivanova won four singles and one doubles titles on the ITF tour in her career. On 17 June 1996, she reached her best singles ranking of world number 351. On 7 October 1996, she peaked at world number 627 in the doubles rankings.

Ivanova made her WTA main draw debut at the Kremlin Cup in the doubles event partnering Natalia Egorova.

Playing for Russia at the Fed Cup, Ivanova has accumulated a win–loss record of 2–0.

Egorova retirement from tennis 1999.

Career statistics

Singles Finals: 7 (5-2)

Doubles Finals: 6 (2-4)

References

External links
 
 

1977 births
Living people
Russian female tennis players
Universiade medalists in tennis
Universiade bronze medalists for Russia
Medalists at the 1995 Summer Universiade
20th-century Russian women
21st-century Russian women